Ten referendums were held in Switzerland in 1984. The first three were held on 26 February on introducing tolls for HGVs (approved), introducing tolls for national routes (approved) and a popular initiative "for a real civilian service based on a proof through demonstration" (rejected). The next two were held on 20 May on popular initiatives "against the abuse of bank client confidentiality and bank power" (rejected) and "against the sellout of the homeland" (rejected).

Two further referendums were held on 23 September on popular initiatives "for a future without further nuclear power plants" (rejected) and "for a secure, parsimonious and ecologically sound energy supply" (rejected). The final three were held on 2 December on a popular initiative "for an effective protection of maternity" (rejected), a federal resolution on an article in the Swiss Federal Constitution relating to broadcasting (approved) and a popular initiative "for the compensation of victims of violent crimes" (approved).

Results

February: HGV tolls

February: Tolls on national routes

February: Civilian service

May: Banks

May: Sellout of the homeland

September: Nuclear power plants

September: Energy supply

December: Maternity protection

December: Constitutional article on broadcasting

December: Victims of violent crime

References

1984 referendums
1984 in Switzerland
Referendums in Switzerland